William Henry Kimball (April 10, 1826 – December 30, 1907) was a Mormon pioneer and was the oldest son of Heber C. Kimball, an early Latter-day Saint leader.

Kimball was born in Mendon, New York. He earned his place in Latter-day Saint pioneer history for his bravery and gallantry in defending his family and the Latter-day Saints. Kimball served as a general in the Utah Militia and led his men in the Indian wars and handcart pioneer rescue. As one of "Brigham's Boys", he was on call to serve whenever and wherever Brigham Young and the other Latter-day Saint leaders needed minutemen to protect the pioneers. Kimball settled in Parley's Park, where his stage station and hotel gained notoriety with travelers, including Mark Twain. Like many early Latter-day Saints, Kimball practiced plural marriage and had five wives and twenty-five children. (He was eventually divorced from two of his wives.) His house and barn stand to this day at Kimball's Junction near Park City, Utah.

Kimball was a missionary for the Church of Jesus Christ of Latter-day Saints in England from 1854 to 1856.

Kimball died in Coalville, Utah.

References
 Larsen, M.K., The Forgotten Son, Downs Printing, Inc.; Hyrum, UT; back cover.
 Kimball, Stanley B., Heber C. Kimball, Patriarch and Pioneer, (University of Illinois Press, Urbana and Chicago, 1986), p. 65.
 Whitney, Orson, F., Life of Heber C. Kimball, (Bookcraft, Salt Lake City, 1888), p. 266.

External links

1826 births
1907 deaths
19th-century Mormon missionaries
American Mormon missionaries in England
Latter Day Saints from New York (state)
Latter Day Saints from Utah
Mormon pioneers
People from Mendon, New York
People from Summit County, Utah